John Robert Nimmo (12 June 1910 – 2 November 1994) was a New Zealand cricketer who played two first-class matches for the Otago Volts in the 1930s. He was born and died in Dunedin.

See also
 List of Otago representative cricketers

1910 births
1994 deaths
New Zealand cricketers
Otago cricketers